Jim D. Cudaback (born 1938)  is a politician from the U.S. state of Nebraska. From 1991 to 2007, he represented the 36th District in the Nebraska Legislature.

Cudaback was born on April 12, 1938, in Riverdale, Nebraska, and graduated from Riverdale High School. He also attended Kearney State College, Lincoln School of Commerce,  and U.S. Air Force schools. After that, he served in the U.S. Air Force.

Cudaback was elected in 1990 to represent the 36th Nebraska legislative district; he was re-elected in 1994, 1998, and 2002.  At the end of his tenure he sat on the Appropriations committee, the Committee on Committees, and was the vice chairperson Executive Board and the Reference committee. A term-limits law passed by Nebraska voters in 2001 precluded his running for re-election in 2006.

References
 
 

1938 births
Living people
People from Buffalo County, Nebraska
University of Nebraska at Kearney alumni
Nebraska state senators